Alfred Freddie "Al" Denson (born January 2, 1942) is a former American football wide receiver who played collegiately at Florida A&M University, and professionally for eight seasons, for the Denver Broncos of the American Football League (AFL), and the National Football League's Broncos and Minnesota Vikings. He was drafted by the Broncos in the sixth round of the 1964 AFL Draft and by the Philadelphia Eagles in the sixth round of the 1964 NFL Draft, but chose to sign with Denver.

Denison made limited starts in his first two seasons, combining for 485 yards in nine games over those seasons with one touchdown. In 1966, he showed promise with 36 catches for 725 yards with three touchdowns in his first full year. The following year, he led the league in touchdowns with 11 on 46 receptions for 899 yards. The following year, he made just seven starts while catching 34 passes for 586 yards and five touchdowns. He improved in 1969, catching 53 passes for 809 yards for 10 touchdowns.

In 1970, his last with the Broncos, he started each game and caught 47 passes for 646 yards with two touchdowns. After the season, he moved to Minnesota. He made appearances in seven games but caught just ten passes in that span for no touchdowns. At the age of 29, he retired from the league.

See also
 List of American Football League players

References

1942 births
Living people
American football tight ends 
American football wide receivers
Denver Broncos (AFL) players
Denver Broncos players
Florida A&M Rattlers football players
Minnesota Vikings players
American Football League All-Star players
Players of American football from Jacksonville, Florida